is a railway station in Aira, Kagoshima, Japan.

Lines

Layout 
The station consists of a side platform and an island platform serving three tracks at grade. The station building is a wooden building in European style with a sloping tiled roof. It houses a waiting area, automatic ticket vending machines, SUGOCA card readers and a staffed ticket window. Access to the island platform is by means of a footbridge.

Management of the passenger facilities at the station has been outsourced to the JR Kyushu Tetsudou Eigyou Co., a wholly owned subsidiary of JR Kyushu specialising in station services. It staffs the ticket booth which is equipped with a POS machine but does not have a Midori no Madoguchi facility.

Platforms

JR

Adjacent stations

History
The station was opened on 1 April 1926 by Japanese Government Railways (JGR) as an additional station on the existing track of what was then part of the route of the Kagoshima Main Line. By 1927, however, another track had been laid from  through  down the west coast of Kyushu to Kagoshima and this was now designated as part of the Kagoshima Main Line. The route from Yatsushiro through  and Chōsa to Kagoshima was then designated as the Hisatsu Line on 17 October 1927. The entire stretch of this track was then redesignated as the Nippō Main Line on 6 December 1932. With the privatization of Japanese National Railways (JNR), the successor of JGR, on 1 April 1987, Chōsa came under the control of JR Kyushu.

Passenger statistics
In fiscal 2016, the station was used by an average of 1,491 passengers daily (boarding passengers only), and it ranked 117th among the busiest stations of JR Kyushu.

Nearby places
Aira City Hall
Aira City Library
Japan National Route 10

See also
 List of railway stations in Japan

References

External links

Chōsa (JR Kyushu)

Railway stations in Japan opened in 1926
Railway stations in Kagoshima Prefecture